The National Hydrocarbons Institute (1980–1995, INH) was a Spanish state-owned oil and gas company established through Law 45/1981, to manage the business-related activities of the petroleum industry in the country.

See also
 Ministry of Industry (Spain)
 SEPI

References

Oil and gas companies of Spain
Spain
Government-owned companies of Spain
Energy companies established in 1981
Non-renewable resource companies established in 1981
Non-renewable resource companies disestablished in 1995